Jean McLean  (born 3 October 1934) is a former Australian politician.

McLean was born in London to industrial scientist Arthur Marsden Crosland and high school principal Pauline Berezovsky; she was home-schooled except for brief periods at public school. Having moved to Australia she joined the Labor Party in 1965, and became union director of the Prahran College of Advanced Education from 1974 to 1980. From 1981 to 1985 she was ACTU Arts Officer and was a federal conference delegate from 1976 to 1988. In 1985 she was elected to the Victorian Legislative Council representing Boronia Province; when that seat was abolished in 1992 she moved to Melbourne West Province, which she represented until her retirement in 1999. has had a prominent and sometimes controversial career as a politician and as an activist in support of a broad range of high profile public causes.

Jean came to public notice as convenor of the Save our Sons Movement, which from 1965 to 1973 campaigned against conscription and Australia's involvement in the Vietnam War. She was also vice-chair of the Vietnam Moratorium Movement.

In 1970 she became one of the 'Fairlea Five', a group of anti-conscription women who spent 14 days in Fairlea Women's Prison after being charged with trespass when they entered a building to hand out leaflets.

In 1985, Jean was elected to the Legislative Council as ALP member for Boronia Province until 1992 and then as MLC for Melbourne West Province until her retirement as an MLC in 1999.

As a parliamentarian, she was particularly active on the Drugs and Crime Prevention Committee and the Law Reform Committee, which was responsible for reforming the jury system and developing witness protection.

As an active member of the ALP she immersed herself in a range of international causes, including those of Namibia, West Papua and most notably East Timor.

Her involvement with East Timor has been extensive. She gave tireless support to the East Timorese resistance in their long struggle to achieve independence. She visited East Timor when it was under Indonesian occupation and subsequently leading up to and following independence. Her interventions have seen Victoria University become involved in the struggle for and independence of East Timor, and she has acted as a champion for the University's continued role in the development of Timor L'este and its people.

As a Councillor of Victoria University for nine years, she has been a significant contributor to the development and advancement of our University.

In recognition of her outstanding work as an activist, her extensive political career as a dedicated member of the Victorian Parliament and her significant contributions to Victoria University, she was given and honorary degree of Doctor of the University, honoris causa, the Hon Jean McLean.

In 2016 Jean received the ” Order of Timor-Leste “ from your President Tour Matan Ruak

Jean has two children and two grandchildren and continues her work as an activist ...

References

1934 births
Living people
Australian Labor Party members of the Parliament of Victoria
Members of the Victorian Legislative Assembly
Politicians from London
Women members of the Victorian Legislative Council
Members of the Order of Australia
British emigrants to Australia